The John von Neumann Award, named after John von Neumann, is given annually by the Rajk László College for Advanced Studies in Budapest, to an outstanding scholar in the exact social sciences, whose works have had substantial influence over a long period of time on the studies and intellectual activity of the students of the college. The award was established in 1994 and is given annually. In 2013, separately from the annual prize, Kenneth J. Arrow was given the Honorary John von Neumann Award.

This award differentiates itself from other scientific awards on the basis that it is given by students of economics and various social sciences, decided after a long deliberation process. The students select the nominees and vote for the prize-winner in the Assembly of the College after a review and debate regarding the pre-selected names.

2011 recipient Joshua Angrist was subsequently awarded the Nobel Prize in Economics in 2021.

Recipients
Source: Rajk László College of Advanced Studies

 Received honorary prize.

See also 

 List of social sciences awards
 List of economics awards
 Prizes named after people
 John Bates Clark Medal
 Yrjö Jahnsson Award
 Nakahara Prize
 Gossen Prize

References

Bibliography

External links
John von Neumann Award at Rajk László College

Awards established in 1994
Hungarian awards
Economics awards
1994 establishments in Hungary